Australian schools which were formerly referred to as Christian Outreach College (COC) through their affiliation with the Christian Outreach Centre (now International Network of Churches), include:

 Citipointe Christian College, formerly Christian Outreach College Brisbane
 Highlands Christian College, formerly Christian Outreach College Toowoomba
 Suncoast Christian College, formerly Suncoast Christian Outreach College, at Woombye on the Sunshine Coast, Queensland

See also
 Riverside Christian College, formerly Maryborough Christian Academy at the Maryborough Christian Outreach Centre